The meridian 106° west of Greenwich is a line of longitude that extends from the North Pole across the Arctic Ocean, North America, the Pacific Ocean, the Southern Ocean, and Antarctica to the South Pole.

106°W is the Third Meridian of the Dominion Land Survey in Canada.

The 106th meridian west forms a great circle with the 74th meridian east.

From Pole to Pole
Starting at the North Pole and heading south to the South Pole, the 106th meridian west passes through:

{| class="wikitable plainrowheaders"
! scope="col" width="130" | Co-ordinates
! scope="col" | Country, territory or sea
! scope="col" | Notes
|-
| style="background:#b0e0e6;" | 
! scope="row" style="background:#b0e0e6;" | Arctic Ocean
| style="background:#b0e0e6;" |
|-
| style="background:#b0e0e6;" | 
! scope="row" style="background:#b0e0e6;" | Maclean Strait
| style="background:#b0e0e6;" |
|-
| 
! scope="row" | 
| Nunavut — Lougheed Island
|-
| style="background:#b0e0e6;" | 
! scope="row" style="background:#b0e0e6;" | Byam Martin Channel
| style="background:#b0e0e6;" |
|-
| 
! scope="row" | 
| Nunavut — Melville Island
|-
| style="background:#b0e0e6;" | 
! scope="row" style="background:#b0e0e6;" | Parry Channel
| style="background:#b0e0e6;" | Viscount Melville Sound
|-
| 
! scope="row" | 
| Nunavut — Stefansson Island, Victoria Island and the Finlayson Islands
|-
| style="background:#b0e0e6;" | 
! scope="row" style="background:#b0e0e6;" | Dease Strait
| style="background:#b0e0e6;" |
|-valign="top"
| 
! scope="row" | 
| Nunavut Northwest Territories — from  Saskatchewan — from 
|-valign="top"
| 
! scope="row" | 
|-valign="top"
| 
! scope="row" | 
| Chihuahua Durango — from  Sinaloa — from 
|-
| style="background:#b0e0e6;" | 
! scope="row" style="background:#b0e0e6;" | Pacific Ocean
| style="background:#b0e0e6;" |
|-
| style="background:#b0e0e6;" | 
! scope="row" style="background:#b0e0e6;" | Southern Ocean
| style="background:#b0e0e6;" |
|-
| 
! scope="row" | Antarctica
| Unclaimed territory
|-
|}

See also
105th meridian west
107th meridian west

w106 meridian west